A Dance to the Music of Time is a British four-part television drama series based on the book series of the same name by Anthony Powell. The series was also written  by Anthony Powell with Hugh Whitemore as co-writer. The series was produced by Table Top Productions and directed by Christopher Morahan and Alvin Rakoff. It was first broadcast on Channel 4 on the 9 October 1997 over four consecutive weeks.

Synopsis

Cast

Episodes

Critical reception
The Thomas Sutcliffe of The Independent described the first episode in the series if It's questionable whether any literary work can survive a compression as intense as that undergone by A Dance to the Music of Time and went on to mention For obvious reasons barely even a homeopathic trace of Powell's patrician ruminations remain - what has survived are the incidents upon which he strung his grand reflections.

Accolades

References

External links

1997 British television series debuts
1997 British television series endings
1990s British drama television series
Channel 4 original programming
English-language television shows